In 1990, elections were held for the Congress of People's Deputies of Russia and the Supreme Soviets of 14 other republics of the Soviet Union.

Background 
The proposal to create a "two-story" system for the formation of the legislative branch (with Congress of Deputies and the Supreme Soviet) in the USSR and its constituent and autonomous republics was put forward by Mikhail Gorbachev at the 19th Conference of the Communist Party in summer of 1988. On 1 December, the corresponding changes were made to the Constitution of the USSR.

Most of the republics except for Russia and its autonomous region of Dagestan ignored this requirement of the Union Constitution. Under the constitutional reform of 1989–90, they retained direct elections to their Supreme Soviets, but unlike the campaigns of preceding 50 years, republican branches of the CPSU now were facing significant opposition from the nationalist forces, represented in organizations such as Lithuania's Sąjūdis and numerous "Popular Fronts" (Estonia, Latvia, Moldavia, Azerbaijan).

List

See also 
1989 Soviet Union legislative election
Democratization

References

Notes 

1990 elections in the Soviet Union
Regional elections in the Soviet Union